Marvin Antonio Chávez (born November 3, 1983 in La Ceiba) is a Honduran footballer who played as a midfielder, most recently for C.D. Marathón in the Liga Nacional.

Career

Club
Chávez – who is nicknamed "el hijo del viento" (the son of the wind) – spent the early part of his professional career playing in Honduras for Victoria and Marathón. He signed with FC Dallas of Major League Soccer (MLS) on a loan deal in August 2009. During the 2010 season, he became an important player for Dallas helping the club reach the MLS Cup final. On November 21, 2010, he played 105 minutes in MLS Cup 2010 in which his club fell to Colorado Rapids. Chávez continued his fine play during the 2011 MLS season and was named to the MLS Team of the Week for weeks 10 and 12 after goal-scoring performances against Real Salt Lake and the New England Revolution. He gained Team of the Week honors again in week 19 against the New York Red Bulls.

On December 16, 2011, Chávez was traded to the San Jose Earthquakes in exchange for allocation money. He had a breakout season in 2012 for San Jose as he made 27 league appearances and recorded 3 goals and 13 assists in helping his new club capture the 2012 Supporters Shield. His stay in San Jose ended on January 7, 2014, when he was traded to the Colorado Rapids in exchange for his former FC Dallas teammate Atiba Harris. Colorado was not a good fit for Chávez. He played only 39 minutes for the club before being traded to Chivas USA on May 8, 2014, in exchange for Luke Moore.

On February 26, 2015, Chávez signed with NASL side San Antonio Scorpions. He played 27 matches for the Scorpions before the club ceased operations in December 2015. In February 2016, Chávez signed with expansion team Rayo OKC of the NASL.

International
Chávez made his debut for Honduras in an August 2006 friendly match against Venezuela. As of April 2015, he has earned a total of 48 caps while scoring four goals. He has represented his country in FIFA World Cup qualification matches, the 2009 and 2011 UNCAF Nations Cups, the 2009 and 2013 CONCACAF Gold Cups, and the 2014 FIFA World Cup.

Career statistics

International goals
Scores and results list Honduras' goal tally first.

Personal life

Chávez earned his U.S. green card in January 2013. This status qualifies him as a domestic player for MLS roster purposes.

Honours

FC Dallas
 Major League Soccer Western Conference Playoff Championship: 2010

San Jose Earthquakes
 Major League Soccer Supporters Shield: 2012
 Major League Soccer Western Conference Regular Season Championship: 2012

References

External links
 
 

1983 births
Living people
People from La Ceiba
Association football wingers
Garifuna people
Honduran footballers
Honduras international footballers
2009 UNCAF Nations Cup players
2009 CONCACAF Gold Cup players
2011 Copa Centroamericana players
2013 CONCACAF Gold Cup players
2014 FIFA World Cup players
C.D. Victoria players
C.D. Marathón players
FC Dallas players
San Jose Earthquakes players
Colorado Rapids players
Chivas USA players
San Antonio Scorpions players
Rayo OKC players
Liga Nacional de Fútbol Profesional de Honduras players
Honduran expatriate footballers
Expatriate soccer players in the United States
Major League Soccer players
Major League Soccer All-Stars
North American Soccer League players
Copa Centroamericana-winning players